Dolores Sucre y Lavayen was an Ecuadorian poet and descendant of Antonio José de Sucre. She was on a stamp in her home country.

References 

Ecuadorian women writers
People from Guayaquil